The following international wheat production statistics come from the Food and Agriculture Organization figures from faostat database, older from International Grains Council figures from the report "Grain Market Report".

The quantities of wheat in the following table are in million metric tonnes. All countries with a typical production quantity of at least 2 million metric tonnes are listed below.

References 

Wheat
Wheat
 
Wheat